Teretiopsis nodicarinatus is a species of sea snail, a marine gastropod mollusk in the family Raphitomidae.

Description
The length of the shell attains 4.9 mm, its diameter 2.9 mm.

Teretiopsis nodicarinatus live in demersal and tropical environments.

Distribution
This marine species was found in Southeast Pacific, off the Salas y Gómez Ridge at a depth of 750 m.

References

External links
  Kantor, Yu.I. & Sysoev, A.S. (1989) The morphology of toxoglossan gastropods lacking a radula, with a description of a new species and genus of Turridae. Journal of Molluscan Studies, 55, 537–550
 

nodicarinatus
Gastropods described in 1989